Lac Noir is a lake in Orbey, Alsace, France. At an elevation of 955 m, its surface area is 0.14 km².

Noir
L Lac Noir